United New Zealand was a centrist political party in New Zealand founded in 1995. It merged with the Christian-based Future New Zealand party to form the United Future New Zealand party in 2000.

History

Formation
United was founded on 28 June 1995, one of a number of new parties hoping to capitalise on the upcoming switch to the MMP electoral system. It was intended to be a liberal centrist party, encompassing moderate voters from both the centre-left and the centre-right. The party was established by four MPs from the National Party, two MPs from the Labour Party, and former Labour MP Peter Dunne, who had already established his own party, Future New Zealand (not to be confused with the Christian-based party of the same name which United later merged with). The party was led by Clive Matthewson, a former Labour MP.

The MPs who established United were:

1996 election
The party, while initially attracting interest, performed poorly in the 1996 election. The party's policies were centrist and liberal in nature but to many appeared too bland to attract media profile. In addition, Matthewson, while charismatic, was seen by many as an intellectual light-weight. Bruce Cliffe had indicated he would resign from Parliament in 1996. Peter Dunne was the only United MP to retain his seat, with all others being ejected from Parliament. Clive Matthewson, whose seat had been abolished in the change to MMP, placed fourth in his new electorate.

As the party's only surviving MP, Peter Dunne became leader of United. When United entered into a coalition with the governing National Party in 1996, securing a Cabinet post for Peter Dunne, many commentators claimed that the party had abandoned its centrist stance. United claimed that a deal with National would allow United to moderate National's more extreme right-wing tendencies and that such arrangements would become common practice under the new MMP system.

1997 saw the merging into United of the Advance NZ Party, Ethnic Minority Party and the Conservatives; all small centre-right parties established to contest the 1996 election.

1999 election
In the 1999 election, United's share of the vote declined even further, with swinging voters shifting to Labour to oust the Shipley government. However, Peter Dunne managed to retain his electorate seat thereby preserving United's parliamentary representation.

Later developments
United merged with a social conservative, evangelical Christian-based party Future New Zealand (not to be confused with Peter Dunne's party before United was formed) in 2000. Future New Zealand, formerly the Christian Democrats, was not represented in parliament. Of these caucuses, Dunne remained the only electorate MP, while his caucus was formed from United Future's MMP party list, and consisted of MPs who were progressive on social justice issues but conservative on some moral issues.

Electoral results

References

 
United Party
Political parties established in 1995
Political parties disestablished in 2000